Camille Mathéi de Valfons (11 January 1837, Nîmes - 1 July 1907) was a French Orléanist politician. He was a member of the National Assembly from 1871 to 1876 and a member of the Chamber of Deputies from 1876 to 1881.

References

External links

1837 births
1907 deaths
People from Nîmes
Politicians from Occitania (administrative region)
Orléanists
Members of the National Assembly (1871)
Members of the 1st Chamber of Deputies of the French Third Republic
Members of the 2nd Chamber of Deputies of the French Third Republic